CAAT may refer to:
Civil Aviation Authority of Thailand, an independent agency of the Thai government.
Computer Assisted Auditing Techniques Techniques and computer programs that are developed to audit electronic data
Centro de Apoyo Académico y Tutorías Academic Student Support Services & Tutoring Center  
Center for Alternatives to Animal Testing, a US research center
Campaign Against Arms Trade, a British campaigning organisation
The CAAT box in molecular genetics
The Children's Air Ambulance Trust, a fundraising organisation for the Children's Air Ambulance
Cornwall Air Ambulance Trust, a charity that maintains and runs the Cornwall air ambulance
Combined Anti-Armor Team - Highly mobile Anti-Armor teams used by the United States Marine Corps
Captive Air Amphibious Transporter, a DARPA tracked amphibious vehicle carrying containers from ship to shore
A Community Awareness Action Team based in Westminster, Colorado
Colleges of Applied Arts and Technology in the Canadian province of Ontario